The Krupp C64 (sometimes C/64) steel, breech loaded field gun (8cm caliber, 4 kg projectile, 3800m range) was one of the main artillery pieces of the Prussians in the 1870–1871 war with France. It was superior to the French counterparts in every way: accuracy, rate of fire, range and reliability of the fuse. The obturation, a big problem in earlier Krupp rifled breech loaders, was ensured by Broadwell ring design borrowed from American engineer Lewis Wells Broadwell.

The C64 was the sole gun of the horse artillery units. Each unit comprised three batteries, each battery was equipped with six C64 guns, for a total of eighteen guns per unit. The foot artillery units had an equal mixture of C64 and the heavier C67 (six-pounder gun).

See also 
 7.7 cm FK 96

References

External links 
 Technical data
 Ammunition pictures
 Picture in Turkish service

Field artillery of Germany